Chroesthes is a genus of flowering plants belonging to the family Acanthaceae.

Its native range is Southern China, Indo-China, Malesia.

Species:

Chroesthes bracteata 
Chroesthes lanceolata 
Chroesthes longifolia

References

Acanthaceae
Acanthaceae genera